National Secondary Route 155, or just Route 155 (or ) is a National Road Route of Costa Rica, located in the Guanacaste province.

Description
In Guanacaste province the route covers Santa Cruz canton (Tempate, Cartagena, Cabo Velas, Tamarindo districts), Carrillo canton (Belén district).

References

Highways in Costa Rica